Sunethra Bandaranaike is a Sri Lankan philanthropist and socialite. A member of the Bandaranaike family, she is the eldest daughter of former Prime Ministers S.W.R.D. Bandaranaike and Sirimavo Bandaranaike and sister of former President Chandrika Bandaranaike Kumaratunga and former Speaker of Parliament Anura Bandaranaike.

Early life and Career

Sunethra Bandaranaike was born on 27 July 1943. Bandaranaike completed her schooling at St Bridget's Convent, Colombo, and  received a BA in Philosophy, Politics and Economics from Somerville College, University of Oxford. She worked as a researcher in the Minority Rights Group and the Overseas Development Institute and held the post of Coordinating Secretary to the Prime Minister of Sri Lanka during her mother's tenure. She currently chairs the Sunera Foundation, a NGO which works with differently abled youth and adults.

Personal life

Sunethra has been married twice. Her marriage to Kumar Rupesinghe lasted four years and her second marriage was to Udaya Nanayakkara which lasted nine years.

Gallery

See also
List of political families in Sri Lanka

References

External links
 Sunera Foundation
 The Bandaranaike Ancestry 
 The Ratwatte Ancestry

Sri Lankan philanthropists
Sinhalese women
Sri Lankan Buddhists
Alumni of Somerville College, Oxford
Alumni of St. Bridget's Convent, Colombo
Living people
Sunethra
Ratwatte family
Sunethra
1943 births